Nin-kisalsi was a Sumerian ruler of the Mesopotamian city of Adab in the mid-3rd millennium BCE, probably circa 2500 BCE.

His name does not appear in the Sumerian King List, but he is known from one inscription bearing his name. The inscription, on a bowl fragment, reads:

It appears from this inscription that King Mesilim of Kish was contemporary with Nin-kisalsi and probably his suzerain. Another such ruler is Lugalshaengur, Governor of Lagash, who also appears in inscriptions as a vassal of Mesilim.

References

Sumerian kings
26th-century BC Sumerian kings
Kings of Adab